Eyes on the Prize is an American documentary film about the Civil Rights Movement.

Eyes on the Prize may refer to:

 Eyes on the Prize (album), a 2003 album by the hip hop group 3 The Hard Way
 "Eyes on the Prize", a 1994 episode of the American animated series The Critic
 "Keep Your Eyes on the Prize", an American folk song
 "Eyes on the Prize", a song by Sara Groves on the 2011 album Invisible Empires